Kathleen Gerson (born August 6, 1947) is an American sociologist. She is considered as an authority on such subjects as gender equality particularly within relationships and marriages, changing gender roles, family housework patterns, travel patterns, finances and how they affect household formation, and other aspects of changing family life. Her research is often based on qualitative interviews. She is a tenured professor at New York University.

Research
Gerson's research has studied changing patterns among men and women in the past few decades. She found that young American men ideally want "equal relationships" but that in practice it is often hard to achieve in the real world with "round-the-clock hours and unpredictable on-call availability." In her 2009 book The Unfinished Revolution, she argued that young men and women often planned to marry but were taking their time, and that many found it acceptable to stay unwed if they can not meet their self-imposed high standards for themselves or their partners; she wrote that young women increasingly would prefer to stay single rather than marry and become the sole household raiser of children.

Gerson examined changing patterns among fathers and mothers and housework. For example, she argued in 1997 that the perception that "women can do it all"—in the sense of having both a career and a family—that this perception caused problems, since fathers reluctant to pitch in with household chores could use that perception as an excuse for them not to work, and fathers who wanted to help out with housework were often not accepted by society. She argued that changes in workplace policies affected thinking about gender roles, and that gender boundaries were "blurring". Her examinations of young people who were dating found it less likely that women were seeking men with large "paychecks" and men seeking women as "sex objects", but rather that both sexes were "looking for the whole package". She argued that women who left the workforce did not do so simply to care for children but rather that the motivations were "much more complicated." Her studies detailed numerous stresses on modern marriages, with couples striving to find satisfying relationships while divvying chores in egalitarian ways. In recent years, as persons age, they will move in and out of "different types of families" during their lives, according to her research. She found that men are less concerned if their girlfriend or wife earns more than they do, and more concerned with longer-term issues such as affording a house. She said that Americans were less likely to spend more time on vacation, compared to Europeans, partially because of a culture of "vacation-shaming" and not purely economic concerns.

Selected publications
 The Unfinished Revolution: Coming of Age in a New Era of Gender, Work, and Family, 2009, Oxford.
 No Man's Land in 1993, BasicBooks.

References

External links
http://www.sociology.fas.nyu.edu/kathleengerson
http://www.KathleenGerson.com
Gerson CV

Living people
American sociologists
New York University faculty
Stanford University alumni
University of California, Berkeley alumni
American women sociologists
1947 births
21st-century American women